Jordan Johnstone (born 24 May 1997) is an English professional rugby league footballer who plays as a  for Widnes Vikings in the Betfred Championship.

Johnstone previously played for Whitehaven in the Kingstone Press Championship, the Widnes Vikings in the Super League and on loan from Widnes at the London Broncos in the Betfred Championship.

Background
Johnstone was born in Whitehaven, Cumbria, England.

Playing career

Whitehaven
He was in the Cumbria Regional Academy system and played his junior rugby league for the Kells club.

He made his début for Whitehaven in the Kingstone Press Championship in 2015.

Widnes Vikings
At the end of 2015 he moved to the Widnes Vikings, making his début in 2016 against the Catalans Dragons.

In 2018 Johnstone joined the London Broncos on loan, and made his Broncos debut in the victory over the Dewsbury Rams in Round 2 of the Betfred Championship.

Hull FC
Johnstone signed for Hull FC for the 2020 season.

Widnes Vikings (rejoin)
In September 2022 it was announced that he had rejoined Widnes Vikings on a 2-year deal.

References

External links
Widnes Vikings profile
London Broncos profile
SL profile

1997 births
Living people
Hull F.C. players
London Broncos players
Rugby league halfbacks
Rugby league players from Whitehaven
Widnes Vikings players
Whitehaven R.L.F.C. players